The 2012 WCHA Men's Ice Hockey Tournament will be played between March 9 and March 17, 2012 at six conference arenas and the Xcel Energy Center in St. Paul, Minnesota. The winner will receive the Broadmoor Trophy as the tournament's champions, and will be awarded the Western Collegiate Hockey Association's automatic bid to the 2012 NCAA Division I Men's Ice Hockey Tournament.

Format
The first round of the postseason tournament features a best-of-three games format. All twelve conference teams participate in the tournament. Teams are seeded No. 1 through No. 12 according to their final conference standing, with a tiebreaker system used to seed teams with an identical number of points accumulated. The top six seeded teams each earn home ice and host one of the lower seeded teams.

The winners of the first round series advance to the Xcel Energy Center for the WCHA Final Five, the collective name for the quarterfinal, semifinal, and championship rounds. The Final Five uses a single-elimination format. Teams are re-seeded No. 1 through No. 6 according to the final regular season conference standings, with the top two teams automatically advancing to the semifinals.  All Final Five games will be broadcast by Fox Sports North and carried by Root Sports Rocky Mountain and Fox College Sports Central.

Conference standings
Note: GP = Games played; W = Wins; L = Losses; T = Ties; PTS = Points; GF = Goals For; GA = Goals Against

Bracket
Teams are reseeded after the first round

Note: * denotes overtime periods

Results

First round

(1) Minnesota vs. (12) Alaska-Anchorage

(2) Minnesota-Duluth vs. (11) Minnesota State

(3) Denver vs. (10) Wisconsin

(4) North Dakota vs. (9) Bemidji State

(5) Colorado College vs. (8) Michigan Tech

(6) St. Cloud State vs. (7) Nebraska-Omaha

Quarterfinals

(3) Denver vs. (8) Michigan Tech

(4) North Dakota vs. (6) St. Cloud State

Semifinals

(1) Minnesota vs. (4) North Dakota

(2) Minnesota-Duluth vs. (3) Denver

Championship

(3) Denver vs. (4) North Dakota

Tournament awards

All-Tournament Team
F Mario Lamoureux (North Dakota)
F Brock Nelson (North Dakota)
F Jason Zucker (Denver)
D Derek Forbort (North Dakota)
D Andrew MacWilliams (North Dakota)
G Aaron Dell* (North Dakota)
* Most Valuable Player(s)

References

External links
Western Collegiate Hockey Association
'Second Season' Gets Underway Friday with Six First Round Men's WCHA Playoff Series

WCHA Men's Ice Hockey Tournament
WCHA Men's Ice Hockey Tournament